Gypsey may refer to:

Gypsey (spring), an intermittent spring or stream
Gypsey Race, a small river in Yorkshire

See also
Gypsy (disambiguation)
Gipsey Bridge, hamlet in Thornton le Fen, Lincolnshire, UK
Spanish Gypsy (disambiguation)